Tai Tan is a village of in the Sai Kung North area of Tai Po District, Hong Kong.

Administration
Tai Tan is a recognized village under the New Territories Small House Policy.

History
At the time of the 1911 census, the population of Tai Tan was 35. The number of males was 12.

See also
 Long Harbour (Hong Kong)

References

External links

 Delineation of area of existing village Che Ha (Sai Kung North) for election of resident representative (2019 to 2022)
 Antiquities Advisory Board. Historic Building Appraisal. Nos. 4-6 Tai Tan Pictures

Villages in Tai Po District, Hong Kong
Sai Kung North